Redhouse is an unincorporated community in Garrett County, Maryland, United States, located at the intersection of U.S. Route 50 and U.S. Route 219 near the West Virginia state line.

References

Unincorporated communities in Garrett County, Maryland
Unincorporated communities in Maryland